Write.. is the debut extended play by South Korean singer Woohyun. It was released by Woollim Entertainment on May 9, 2016. The EP marked the official solo debut of Woohyun, who had been known as a member of South Korean boy group Infinite for nearly six years.

The album was sold out before its Offline release on May 9 with a total of 50,000 copies.

Background and release
In July 2015, Woohyun revealed in an interview with Infinite member on KBS' Music Bank that he is currently working his solo album. Regarding which genre he would like to try out, Woohyun said, "Because I like ballads, I want to do a ballad.  I even have ambitions for a band or dance.  I am working on my solo album, too."

In early April 2016, Woollim Entertainment confirmed that Woohyun will be making his solo debut in May. On April 26, 2016, Woohyun was announced to be debuting as a solo singer with Write.. was schedule released on May 9, becoming the second Infinite member to have released a solo album, after Sungkyu. On May 3, the album's tracklist was released, revealed that Woohyun participated to written and composed three tracks of six tracks of the album.

Promotion
Woohyun held a showcase for Write.. on May 9 with Infinite's Sungkyu as the MC. He started promotion on television weekly music program on May 12.

Track listing

Charts

Release history

References 

2016 debut EPs
Korean-language EPs
Woollim Entertainment EPs
Kakao M EPs
Nam Woo-hyun EPs